Barban ( Čakavian Barbon, or Brban) is a small town and municipality in the southern part of eastern Istria, Croatia.

The municipality of Barban covers an area of around 100 km2 and contains 72 villages with a total of 2,721 people, 75% of whom are Croats. The town of Barban itself has a population of 221.

History
The site of a Bronze Age prehistoric hill fort, human remains have been found on the site that dates back approximately 3,400-4,000 years back. The name Barban appears for the first time in an ecclesiastic document dated 740 A.D. In the Middle Ages, the town was fortified while under control of feudal lords from Pazin, and parts of those medieval fortifications can still be seen. In the second half of the 13th century, having been depopulated by the plague in 1312, a small colony of Dalmatians from Finodol settled in the area, brought by the counts of Gorizia.

In 1374, upon the death of Albert IV, Count of Pazin, it became a full Habsburg possession, before being taken over by the Republic of Venice in the 16th century. In 1534, Venice ceded it to the Loredan family as a heritable possession.

In the main square, which is reached by passing through Velika Vrata (the Great Gate, 1718), stands the St. Nicholas parish church with baroque altars and paintings by Venetian masters from the 16th-18th centuries, a Late Gothic stone tabernacle, and wooden baroque sculptures.

Prstenac tournament

An equestrian tournament, known as Trka na prstenac and very similar to Sinjska alka, is held in Barban on the third Sunday in August. It is a medieval jousting game that goes back to 1696 in Barban, but it is much older in origins and is otherwise celebrated in various forms in several medieval towns in Italy today. This tradition draws tourists and spectators in great numbers in a lively and popular celebration.

References

Sources

Trka na prstenac

External links 

 
Town of Barban at Istrianet.org

Municipalities of Croatia
Populated places in Istria County